Jackson Simba Kasanzu (born 21 April 2003), is a Tanzanian footballer who plays as a defender for San Diego Loyal in the USL Championship.

Career
Kasanzu, originally from Dar es Salaam in Tanzania, signed with USL League Two side AFC Ann Arbor for their 2022 season, where he made nine regular season appearances. On 12 August 2022, Kasanzu signed his first professional contract, joining USL Championship side San Diego Loyal SC. He made six appearances and scored a single goal as he helped San Diego to the playoffs in their 2022 season.

References

External links
 San Diego Loyal profile

2003 births
Living people
AFC Ann Arbor players
Association football defenders
Expatriate soccer players in the United States
San Diego Loyal SC players
Tanzanian expatriate footballers
Tanzanian footballers
USL Championship players
USL League Two players